Edmond Dame (4 November 1893 – 31 August 1956) was a French wrestler. He was born in Rouvroy in Pas-de-Calais. He was Olympic bronze medalist in Freestyle wrestling in 1928, and also competed at the 1920 and 1924 Olympics.

References

External links

1893 births
1956 deaths
Sportspeople from Pas-de-Calais
Olympic wrestlers of France
Wrestlers at the 1920 Summer Olympics
Wrestlers at the 1924 Summer Olympics
Wrestlers at the 1928 Summer Olympics
French male sport wrestlers
Olympic bronze medalists for France
Olympic medalists in wrestling
Medalists at the 1928 Summer Olympics